Ololygon angrensis is a species of frog in the family Hylidae endemic to Brazil.
Its natural habitats are subtropical or tropical moist lowland forests, rivers, and ponds.
It is threatened by habitat loss.

References

angrensis
Endemic fauna of Brazil
Amphibians described in 1973
Taxonomy articles created by Polbot